Chamrail is a census town in Bally Jagachha CD Block of Howrah Sadar subdivision in Howrah district in the Indian state of West Bengal. It is a part of Kolkata Urban Agglomeration.

Chamrail is under the jurisdiction of Liluah Police Station of Howrah City Police.

Chamrail is famous for the historical Brambha Vishnu Maheshwara puja. This puja was established in the year 1889 by Narayan Chandra Chakraborty and some other people of chamrail. This puja is the oldest puja of this village.

Geography

It is situated between Eksara and Jagadishpur.

Demographics
As per 2011 Census of India, Chamrail had a total population of 11,923 of which 6,083 (51%) were males and 5,840 (49%) were females. Population below 6 years was 1,197. The total number of literates in Chamrail was 9,278 (86.50% of the population over 6 years).

 India census, Chamrail had a population of 8554. Males constitute 51% of the population and females 49%. Chamrail has an average literacy rate of 76%, higher than the national average of 59.5%; with male literacy of 81% and female literacy of 71%. 10% of the population is under 6 years of age.

Transport

Benaras Road (part of State Highway 15) is the artery of the town.

Bus

Private Bus
 57A Chanditala - Howrah Station

Mini Bus
 30 Baluhati - Esplanade

Train
Kona railway station is the nearest railway station on Howrah-Amta line.

References

Cities and towns in Howrah district
Neighbourhoods in Kolkata
Kolkata Metropolitan Area